San Félix (Leonese: San Fliz) is one of 44 parishes (administrative divisions) in Tineo, a municipality within the province and autonomous community of Asturias, in northern Spain.

Villages and hamlets
 Agoveda 
 Cabañas 
 Eiros 
 Lago 
 La Piñera 
 Ablaneda 
 San Félix

References 

Parishes in Tineo